Edmund Allen Meredith  (7 October 1817 – 2 January 1899) was an Irish lawyer whose career was in public service in Canada.  He was Under Secretary of State for Canada; a prison reformer, writer, president of the Literary and Historical Society of Quebec and the third principal of McGill University from 1846 to 1853. The diary he kept from 1844 until his death is preserved in the National Archives of Canada and formed the basis for the first half of Sandra Gwyn's book The Private Capital: Ambition and Love in the Age of Macdonald and Laurier (1985), which the CBC later made into a television series.

Early life in Ireland

Born at Ardtrea House, County Tyrone, October 7, 1817, he was the fourth son of Rev. Thomas Meredith and Elizabeth Maria Graves (1791–1855), the eldest daughter of Richard Graves, Dean of Ardagh. He was named after his aunt's (Martha Meredith's) husband, "that eccentric genius, the late truly learned and honest"  (Christopher) Edmund Allen (1776–1826) LL.D, of Riverview, Co. Cavan and Cookstown House, Co. Louth; formerly Regius Professor of Common Law at Trinity College, Dublin. He was a brother of Sir William Collis Meredith and first cousins with Sir Richard Graves MacDonnell, Francis Brinkley, Admiral Richard Charles Mayne, John Dawson Mayne, Major-General Arthur Robert MacDonnell, Sir James Creed Meredith and John Walsingham Cooke Meredith. The last named was the father of The Eight London Merediths, who included among them Sir William Ralph Meredith, one of the Pall-bearers at his funeral. Meredith was the uncle and godfather to both Sir Augustus Meredith Nanton and Frederick Edmund Meredith.

Meredith's father died suddenly and mysteriously in 1819, and his mother's second marriage led her to Lower Canada from 1824 until 1832. She took four of her children, but left the other three, including Meredith, in Ireland. He was left in the care of his celebrated uncle, Robert James Graves, and his third wife Anna Grogan. Predominantly brought up by Graves' elderly housekeeper, in 1827 he was sent to Castleknock, a boarding school outside of Dublin. In 1833, he entered Trinity College, Dublin, winning a classical scholarship in his second year and prizes in political economy and science. After graduating (B.A. and M.A. degree) he entered Lincoln's Inn, London and then King's Inns, Dublin, to study law (becoming a Doctor of Laws).

Canada 
While still at King's Inns, he was interested to see how his estranged brothers and sisters lived in Canada and so he embarked on a voyage there in 1842. He stayed with his elder brother, William Collis Meredith at what is now known as Notman House in Montreal, and briefly resumed his study of law at his brother's offices. He returned to Ireland in 1843 to be called to the Irish Bar, but later that year returned to Montreal, invited to do so by William.

In his first diary entry of that year, Meredith talks of his decision to leave Ireland for Canada, revealing his personal angst over the upheaval: "It now seems strange to me that I could have dreamed, even for an instant, of banishing myself from the society of my brother (Richard - Secretary of the Literary Association of the Friends of Poland), and setting up on my own account among complete strangers."

In Montreal, he became a member of the Shakespeare Club, a meeting of which was painted by fellow member Cornelius Krieghoff in 1847. Meredith is depicted along with other members including future Judge Frederick William Torrance, Sir Allan Napier MacNab and John Young (Canadian politician). In 1846 his brother, William, had used his influence to secure him the unpaid but prestigious position of Principal of McGill University in Montreal, a position he held until 1853.

While at McGill, Edmund Meredith played in one of the earliest games of ice hockey to have been described. It took place in the 1850s and thirty years later was written up in the Montreal Star:

Career 
 
During his tenure at McGill University he joined the civil service and moved with the government to Quebec, becoming Under Secretary of State for Canada in Sir John A. Macdonald's government. When the new capital, Ottawa, was founded in 1865, much to his disappointment, he and the rest of the government were forced to move there, writing "the more I see of Ottawa, the more do I dislike and detest it." He was described as ‘one of the outstanding civil servants of his generation’, even if he was "destined to be a man forever ahead of his time." In 1870, John Young, 1st Baron Lisgar offered to Meredith the Chief-Justiceship of St. Lucia, which he declined.

Meredith is best remembered for his role in prison reform, of which he was an active exponent. Following the British North America Act, in 1867 he was appointed the Inspector then Chairman of the Board of Inspectors of Asylums and Prisons etc. Concerning his work on Prison Reform, the Montreal Gazette reported,

He founded the Ottawa Art Association, served as president of the Literary and Historical Society of Quebec, the Park Lawn Tennis Club (Toronto), the Civil Service Board, the Ottawa Literary and Scientific Society, and Vice-President of the Astronomical and Physical Society of Toronto, and finally the part-time position in retirement as Vice-President of the Toronto Loans and Assurance Company (a.k.a. Toronto General Trusts). However, Meredith's capacity for involving his own money in costly speculative ventures (that included organising a trip to Mexico in search of lost treasure) would have been something of a family joke if it hadn't proved to be so expensive for them!

He wrote and published numerous articles and pamphlets, including "An Essay on the Oregon Question (1846)"; "Influence of Recent Gold Discoveries on Prices" (1856); "An Important but Neglectd Branch of Social Science" (1861); "Note on some Emendations (not hitherto suggested) in the text of Shakspeare, with a new explanation of an old passage" (1863); "Glance at the Present State of the Common Gaols of Canada; the individual separation of prisoners (with shortened sentences), recommended on moral and economic grounds" (1864); "Earth Sewage versus Water Sewage", and even a pamphlet on militia training in schools, though he himself did not enjoy "playing at soldiers." His writings, A Trip from Boston to Montreal in 1844 was published in 1925 by his eldest daughter Mary Meredith.

Meredith was awarded an honorary M.A., from Bishop's University, and that of LL.D., from McGill University. He was an honorary member of the American Association for the Promotion of Social Science. In 1854, he spent several weeks making use of the Leviathan of Parsonstown as the guest of his friend William Parsons, 3rd Earl of Rosse, at Birr Castle.

Family

At Rosedale, July 17, 1851 ("the sun shone in unclouded majesty and we had the most delightful breeze"), Meredith married Anne Frances (Fanny) Jarvis (1830–1919), the eldest and favourite daughter of William Botsford Jarvis of Rosedale by his wife, the granddaughter of William Dummer Powell, Mary Boyles Powell. Rosedale, Toronto, previously the Jarvis'  estate is now Toronto's wealthiest residential district. After living in Quebec City and Ottawa, Meredith was finally able to retire to Toronto after a long-awaited 'handsome inheritance' from his Aunt Bella came through from Ireland in 1879. On what had been the apple orchard of the original Rosedale they made their new home, 'a spacious, white-brick house of twenty two rooms', where he died January 12, 1899. Meredith Crescent in Rosedale, Toronto is named for him. The Merediths were the parents of eight children:

Mary Meredith (b.1856), lived to old age but died unmarried.
Alice Louisa Meredith (b.1858), married Archibald Duncan McLean, grandson of her maternal grandfather's old friend, Chief Justice Archibald McLean.
Maude Meredith (1860–62), died an infant.
Arthur Jarvis Meredith (1862-1895), went out to Edmonton, Alberta with his first cousin, Sir Augustus Meredith Nanton, where he died. He married Isabella Osler, niece of Sir William Osler and Sir Edmund Osler. After her husband died, she and their children (who included Allen Osler Meredith) lived with her uncle, Edmund at Toronto.
Ethel Colborne Meredith (1865—1922), married a distant cousin, Ernest Frederick Jarvis.
Clarence Meredith, died an infant in 1868.
Morna Irvine Meredith (b.1871), married Rev. Alfred Reid. They were the parents of Escott Reid C.C.
Lt.-Colonel Colborne Powell Meredith was Commissioner of the Ottawa Improvement Commission; President of the Ontario Architects Association;, and Councillor of the Royal Architectural Institute of Canada. He designed many of the principal buildings and residences in Ottawa, including the Château Laurier Hotel, as well as a number of schools and convents throughout Canada. From 1925 to 1934 Colborne Meredith served as General-Secretary to the League of Nations Society of Canada. He married Emily Griffin of Ottawa. They are the great-grandparents of Anna Meredith. 
  
Meredith's wife had enjoyed "a blessed childhood, with love on all sides", though she was undoubtedly spoilt as the eldest and prettiest daughter. In 1835, to celebrate her fifth birthday, her mother planted a sapling which has since grown into the famous Rosedale Elm. When she was seven she crept out of bed to witness "a magnificent masquerade ball (at Rosedale) that a whole generation of Toronto party-goers would hold benchmark the rest of their lives." She loved horses, keeping two for her carriage and another for cross country adventures, when she would sport a low-crowned beaver hat with a green veil. Her summers were filled with constant riding parties and picnics, including 'a never-to-be-forgotten adventure: Bark canoes paddled by Indians through five miles (8 km) of rapids', whilst on a visit to cousins at Hawkesbury, Ontario on the Ottawa River. She spent two years at finishing school in Paris (where she was delighted to witness the barricades being flung up in the streets during the French Revolution of 1848) before returning to Canada to spend the winter of 1848/49 in Montreal with the family of Edmund's brother, Sir William Collis Meredith, beginning her courtship with Meredith.

Writings 
 Glance at the Present State of the Common Gaols of Canada, 1864
 Earth Sewage versus Water Sewage, 1868

References

 Laid Beside His Son - Funeral of the late Dr Meredith, Daily Mail and Empire, January 17, 1899
 Member of U.E.L. Family - Mrs Edmund Meredith, Widow of Former McGill Principal, Dead, Montreal Gazette, October 4, 1919
 "Recollections" Written at Age of Eighty-Two, Ottawa Citizen, April 11, 1959
 Not much Ceremony Then, Ottawa Citizen, April 29, 1959
 The Inescapable Stink of Early Ottawa, Ottawa Citizen, October 29, 1984
 Pioneer Mandarin's Life - $3,600 A Year and Discreet Perks, Ottawa Citizen, October 30, 1984
 Dazzling Kaleidoscope at the Governor-General's Ball, Ottawa Citizen, October 31, 1984
 Too Much a Canadian For Own Good, Ottawa Citizen, January 2, 1954
 Biography at the Dictionary of Canadian Biography Online
 Meredith Family

Further reading
 The book The Private Capital by Sandra Gwyn provides insight to his life and Canadian politics of the time based on the diary (held at the National Archives in Ottawa) he kept every day from 1844 until his death. The book was made into a television series shown on the Canadian Broadcasting Corporation.

Photographs 
The Gate Lodge to Ardtrea House, Co. Tyrone
 Edmund Allen Meredith with his family at their home in Toronto c.1890
 Frances Anne (Jarvis) Meredith in 1865
 Daughter Mary Meredith (1856-1924) in fancy dress, 1876
 William Botsford Jarvis's cousin, William Jarvis (1756-1817) with his family
 Edmund Allen Meredith, 1863
 Edmund Allen Meredith, 1869
 Edmund Allen Meredith, 1868

1817 births
1899 deaths
19th-century Canadian civil servants
Canadian Anglicans
Canadian diarists
Irish Anglicans
People from County Tyrone
Principals of McGill University
Prison reformers
19th-century diarists